On the evening of 22 May 1985, 18-year-old Winnifred Teo Suan Lie (张碹丽 Zhāng Xuànlì), then a student of Catholic Junior College, went out for a evening jog as usual, but she never came back. The next morning, Teo's naked body was later found lying in the undergrowth off Old Holland Road, Singapore. She has several stab wounds on her body and was sexually assaulted prior to her death. Autopsy reports showed that Teo was being restrained and she put up a fierce struggle against her killer(s) before her death from excessive blood loss.

The brutality of Teo's rape and murder brought great shock across the whole of Singapore back in 1985. Although the police extensively investigated the case, the killer(s) were never caught till today. The case of Teo's murder went on to become one of Singapore's notable unsolved murder cases.

Background and case

Life of Winnifred Teo
Born in 1967, Winnifred Teo Suan Lie was the second of three children, and she has both an elder sister and younger brother. She was a final-year pre-university student of Catholic Junior College. Her father Teo Joo Kim was a company director of a timber firm. At the time Teo was murdered, her sister Martina Teo Suan Siew (aged 20 in 1985) was studying overseas in Australia and her younger brother, Gerald Teo (aged 16 in 1985), was studying in St Joseph's Institution. Teo was also said to have attended the St Ignatius Church in King's Road regularly. Due to her waist long hair with tanned skin, Teo was mistook as a Eurasian when she was actually an ethnic Chinese Singaporean.

According to her teachers, classmates and family, Teo was a model student and well-liked in school. At her school, she was the student counsellor and liked to take part in adventure camps, therefore describing her as an active student in physical activities. During the final days leading up to her death, Teo jogged during evenings to prepare herself for a school adventure camp. She could not find time to do so in school due to heavy schoolwork. Several joggers, like 16-year-old Anglo-Chinese School student Tan Meng Yan, 20-year-old polytechnic graduate Chao Tah Jin and his 16-year-old younger brother Chao Tar Wee, remembered often seeing Teo jogging or cycling along Holland Road, a popular place for joggers and where many female joggers often jogged alone. The Chao brothers described Teo as pretty, with long flowing hair. They said she usually wore pink jogging shoes and brief shorts during her jogs, but never spoke to her due to her being stern-looking.

Final jogging and death
On the evening of 22 May 1985, Teo went out for a jog at Bukit Batok Nature Park as usual, and she left her Maryland Drive terrace house at 6 pm. It was the last time Teo's mother saw her alive.

Teo never came back for the next 14 hours, and her mother became concerned about her daughter's safety, leading to her contacting the police at 4 in the morning of 23 May and reporting Teo missing. The officers from Tanglin Police Division got involved and conducted a search for Teo in the nearby areas where she usually jogged. Six hours later, the police found 18-year-old Winnifred Teo Suan Lie lying dead in the undergrowth at Old Holland Road, about four metres from the road and nearly 1.5km from her home. When she was found, Teo's naked body was covered with mud and bruises, and her neck was riddled with six stab wounds. Her hands were tied using her T-shirt and brassiere, and her shoes, shorts and watch were abandoned nearby the place her body was discovered. It was also suspected that Teo was raped prior to her death.

The news of her death shocked and saddened her family, as well as the students and teachers at her school. The school's students underwent a school-organised mourning period and given an early dismissal on the day her body was found. Teo's father, who was on a business trip at Munich, Germany, immediately flew back home on the same day. Over 500 people, including family members and classmates, showed up at her funeral to mourn Teo's death, for which the horrific nature of her murder sent ripples across the nation. The murder of Teo led to Raffles Junior College warning its 1,700 students then that girls should move in groups of "at least two or three". The female students were also told not to travel alone on lonely roads to and from school, and to not take shortcuts. Other schools similarly warned their students against travelling alone outdoors.

Police investigations
The case of Winnifred Teo's murder was transferred to the Special Investigation Section of the CID for investigations. The police offered a S$50,000 reward for fresh information leading to the arrest and conviction of the killer(s). The offer, which was valid until 31 December 1985, was made due to the little leads the police had to investigate Teo's murder. The reward however, did not draw any new information to help solve the case. An autopsy report by pathologist Clarence Lim confirmed that Teo was raped before her death, and she was attacked by more than one person. She also showed signs of struggle and resistance against her attackers during the sexual assault and stabbing. The weapon, speculated to be a sharp-edged instrument, was never found however despite extensive searches by the police. Over 200 police officers were deployed during the manhunt for the suspects.

The police also interrogated the joggers and other people who often passed by the areas where Teo usually jogged, but they could not find any suspects among these people. They arrested a man, who often exposed himself in front of female joggers in the area some time before Teo's death, but the man was released due to no connection can be made between him and Teo's case. A 1987 update revealed the police were still reviewing the case and there were no new leads in the case. During a 1991 hearing at the coroner's court, the police updated that there was still no progress in their ongoing investigations of Teo's case. The police also could not find any motive behind the murder. They speculated that it might be due to a business-related rivalry with Teo's father that made someone going after Winnifred Teo, who was her father's most favourite child out of the three. However, it was refuted.

Despite the efforts of the police, the killer(s) of Teo were never identified or found as of today.

Aftermath

Suspected serial killing
In February 2000, 27-year-old financial executive Linda Chua was found brutally assaulted and raped at Bukit Batok Nature Park while jogging there. She died eight days later while hospitalized. The police, having found similarities in terms of the circumstances surrounding the cases of Winnifred Teo and Chua, suspected that the killing of Teo could be the work of the same person who raped and killed Chua, and even suspected that Teo's murderer might be a serial killer. However, the autopsy report of Chua's case showed differences in terms of the manner of attack on Chua compared to Teo's, hence the 'serial killing' theory was refuted.

Notoreity of case
The case of Winnifred Teo went on to become one of Singapore's most infamous unsolved murder cases. There were two more murder cases, such as the 1998 unsolved rape-murder of Dini Haryati and 2000 rape-murder of Linda Chua, in which the victims, who went outdoors alone, received a similar fate like Teo.

In 2021, due to the renewed public attention to the unsolved 1995 rape-murder of seven-year-old Lim Shiow Rong, as well as the arrest of Ahmad Danial Mohamed Rafa'ee for the alleged murder of missing student Felicia Teo Wei Ling, the Winnifred Teo murder case and those of Dini and Chua were once again caught in public spotlight due to these cases similarly being unsolved, their killer(s) not arrested and/or their victims being raped and killed.

See also
 Capital punishment in Singapore
 Death of Felicia Teo
 Death of Lim Shiow Rong
 List of major crimes in Singapore (before 2000)
 List of major crimes in Singapore (2000–present)
 List of unsolved murders

References

1985 in Singapore
Deaths by stabbing
Deaths by stabbing in Singapore
Female murder victims
Murder in Singapore
1985 murders in Singapore
Unsolved murders in Singapore
Violence against women in Singapore